LOS.FM 2 is the second mixtape by American record production team League of Starz; It was released on August 13, 2015. The mixtape features appearances from Freddie Gibbs, Dee, Tyga, Snoop Dogg, Skeme, The Game, and more. It is the sequel to their first mixtape LOS.FM (2013). The album only has production from the League of Starz.hi

Track listing

2015 mixtape albums
Sequel albums